Geodia gibberosa, commonly known as the white encrusting sponge, is a species of sea sponge found in the Caribbean. It is eaten by hawksbill turtles. It was first described by Lamarck in 1815.

Description
Geodia gibberosa is a large, dense sponge. It can be white or pale tan when exposed to very little light, or dark brown in areas with a lot of it. It is usually in the form of a knobby, fist-like mass, often up to 50 cm in diameter. It may also occur as a spherical mass without projections and is also known to form large colonies that resemble rounded calcareous rocks. Its skeleton is a bunch of needle-like spicules radiating outward from the center near the surface, much more randomly dispersed on the inside.

Distribution and habitat
Geodia gibberosa is found in the Bahamas, Florida, Brazil, and West Africa. It is commonly found in shallow waters with hard bottoms, generally in the same area as seagrasses.

References

Tetractinellida
Animals described in 1815